He Meitian (born 2 December 1977) is a Chinese actress and former gymnast. She was previously a contracted artist under the Hong Kong television network TVB. After her contract with TVB ended, she returned to mainland China and continued her career with the talent agency Feiteng.

Filmography

Television series
State of Divinity (1996)
Journey to the West (1996 TV series) (TVB, 1996)
Demi-Gods and Semi-Devils (1997)
Smart Kid (2001)
Lian Cheng Jue (2004)
The Patriotic Knights (2006)
Ben Xiao Hai (ATV, 2007)
Young Hero Fong Sai Yuk (2001)
Chess Warriors (2001)

Films
Protégé (2007)
Beauty Pageant (2011)
East Meets West 2011 (2011)
The Flight of Youth (2012)
The Extreme Fox (2014)

References
  https://web.archive.org/web/20111004144830/http://asiacue.com/persons/He_Mei-Tian.html
  http://www.video4asian.com/celebs?n=He_Mei_Tian
  https://www.imdb.com/name/nm2566912/

1975 births
Actresses from Guangdong
Chinese female artistic gymnasts
Living people
People from Chaozhou
Gymnasts from Guangdong
Hong Kong film actresses
Hong Kong television actresses
Chinese film actresses
Chinese television actresses
20th-century Chinese actresses
21st-century Chinese actresses
20th-century Hong Kong actresses
21st-century Hong Kong actresses